Bagh-e-Tatara is a recreational park located in Phase 1, Hayatabad, Peshawar. Tatara Park has been developed from a garden lawn with man-made lakes, into a theme park. 

It is one of the most visited recreational park located in Hayatabad. It is located near by the Bagh-e-Naran

See also
Shahi Bagh
List of parks and gardens in Pakistan

References

Peshawar
Peshawar District
Tourist attractions in Peshawar
Parks in Pakistan
Parks in Khyber Pakhtunkhwa
Hayatabad